Osman Gökhan Şirin (born September 18, 1990) is a Turkish basketball player who plays for Royal Halı Gaziantep of the Turkish Basketball League (TBL).

After two years with Anadolu Efes S.K., during 2013 summer Şirin signed a contract with Beşiktaş.

References

External links
 ESPN Profile
 TBLStat.net Profile

1990 births
Living people
Anadolu Efes S.K. players
Charlotte 49ers men's basketball players
Darüşşafaka Basketbol players
Forwards (basketball)
Gaziantep Basketbol players
Basketball players from Istanbul
Turkish men's basketball players
Turkish expatriate basketball people in the United States